Marco Cardisco, also known as Marco Calabrese, (Born in Tiriolo c.1486 – c.1542) was an Italian painter of the Renaissance period, active mainly in Naples during 1508–1542.

Biography
He was a pupil of the painter and decorator Polidoro da Caravaggio, and influenced by Andrea da Salerno He painted at Sant' Agostino at Aversa. Among his pupils were the painter Pietro Negroni and Giovanni Filippo Crescione. He is also known as Marco Calabrese, because he was born in Calabria.

References

External links

1480s births
1540s deaths
People from the Province of Catanzaro
15th-century Italian painters
Italian male painters
16th-century Italian painters
Renaissance painters